Maki, Niigata may refer to:
Maki, Niigata (Kanbara) (巻町; -machi), Nishikanbara District, Niigata, Japan
Maki, Niigata (Kubiki) (牧村; -mura), Higashikubiki District, Niigata, Japan